David Lee Shankle (born March 7, 1962) is an American guitarist. He is known for his shred style of playing. Shankle was the guitarist for the band Manowar from 1989 to 1995 and he played on the album The Triumph of Steel. He was previously a member of the band Paradoxx with whom he appeared on the Chicago Class Of '85 compilation contributing the song "Night Ryder".

Today he leads his own band, the David Shankle Group. Shankle was endorsed by Dean Guitars. In 2009 Dean released his signature model, the DS7 "shred machine". This guitar is a seven string model with 29 frets, EMG pickups, a custom active EQ also made by EMG and a Kahler tremolo system.

References

External links
 The David Shankle Group
 Official Manowar Website

Living people
American heavy metal guitarists
Manowar members
American male guitarists
1962 births